Polecat is a common name for several mustelid species in the order Carnivora and subfamilies Ictonychinae and Mustelinae. Polecats do not form a single taxonomic rank (i.e. clade). The name is applied to several species with broad similarities to European polecats, the only polecat species native to the British Isles, such as having a dark mask-like marking across the face.

In the United States, the term polecat is sometimes applied to the black-footed ferret, a native member of the Mustelinae. In Southern United States dialect, the term polecat is sometimes used as a colloquial nickname for the skunk, which is part of the family Mephitidae.

Despite their common name, polecats are more closely related to dogs than cats, which is why they are placed in the suborder Caniformia.

Taxonomy
According to the most recent taxonomic scheme proposing eight subfamilies within Mustelidae, polecats are classified as:

Subfamily Ictonychinae
Genus Ictonyx
Striped polecat, I. striatus, (native to Central, Southern, and sub-Saharan Africa)
Saharan striped polecat, I. libycus (Sahara)
Genus Vormela 
Marbled polecat, V. peregusna (Southeastern Europe to western China)
Subfamily Mustelinae
Genus Mustela
Steppe polecat, M. eversmannii (Central and Eastern Europe, and Central Asia)
American polecat (Black-footed ferret) M. nigripes (Southwest United States)
European polecat, M. putorius (Western Eurasia and North Africa)

References

Mustelinae
Mammal common names